Mordellistena parapentas is a species of beetle in the genus Mordellistena of the family Mordellidae. It was described by Ermisch in 1977 and is endemic to Italy.

References

Beetles described in 1977
parapentas
Endemic fauna of Italy
Beetles of Europe